The Turner Island woodrat (Neotoma albigula varia) is a subspecies of rodent in the family Cricetidae.
It is found only in Mexico.

References
Musser, G. G. and M. D. Carleton. 2005. Superfamily Muroidea. pp. 894–1531 in Mammal Species of the World a Taxonomic and Geographic Reference. D. E. Wilson and D. M. Reeder eds. Johns Hopkins University Press, Baltimore.

Neotoma
Mammals described in 1932
Taxonomy articles created by Polbot